Sidney Leslie Ollard (1875 – 28 February 1949) was a British Anglican priest, who served as a Canon of Windsor from 1936 to 1948.

Biography
Born in 1875, he was educated at St John's College, Oxford and graduated BA in 1896, MA in 1899 and D. Litt in 1947.
He died on 28 February 1949.

He was appointed:
Assistant curate, Holy Trinity, Hastings 1899 - 1902
Christ Church (Oxford) Mission, Poplar 1902 - 1903
Vice-Principal of St Edmund Hall, Oxford 1903 - 1913
Rector of Dunsfold 1914 - 1915
Rector of Bainton, Yorkshire 1915 - 1936
Hon. Canon of Worcester Cathedral 1912 - 1935
Prebendary of Wetwang in York Minster 1935 - 1936

He was appointed to the eleventh stall in St George's Chapel, Windsor Castle in 1936, and held the stall until 1948. From its inception in 1939, he was the editor of the Historical monographs relating to St. George's Chapel, Windsor Castle.

References 

Canons of Windsor
Alumni of St John's College, Oxford
1875 births
1949 deaths